Gassville (formerly Mount Pleasant and Turkey's Neck) is a city in Baxter County, Arkansas,  United States.  According to the 2010 census, the city population was 2,078.

Geography
Gassville is located at  (36.283160, -92.490124).

Major highways
 US 62/US 412
 Arkansas Highway 126
 Arkansas Highway 345

Education 
Gassville is served by the Cotter School District and students attend Cotter High School to graduate from public schooling.

Demographics

2020 census

As of the 2020 United States census, there were 2,171 people, 942 households, and 627 families residing in the city.

2010 census
As of the census of 2010, there were 2,158 people, 688 households, and 502 families residing in the city. The racial makeup of the city was 97.83% White, 0.18% Black or African American, 0.41% Native American, 0.29% Asian, 0.06% Pacific Islander, 0.35% from other races, and 0.88% from two or more races.  1.17% of the population were Hispanic or Latino of any race.

There were 653 households, out of which 34.5% had children under the age of 18 living with them, 56.0% were married couples living together, 12.7% had a female householder with no husband present, and 27.4% were non-families. 23.9% of all households were made up of individuals, and 11.3% had someone living alone who was 65 years of age or older.  The average household size was 2.45 and the average family size was 2.89.

In the city, the population was spread out, with 26.8% under the age of 18, 6.8% from 18 to 24, 27.5% from 25 to 44, 20.2% from 45 to 64, and 18.6% who were 65 years of age or older.  The median age was 37 years. For every 100 females, there were 84.8 males.  For every 100 females age 18 and over, there were 78.5 males.

The median income for a household in the city was $25,478, and the median income for a family was $30,481. Males had a median income of $22,955 versus $17,267 for females. The per capita income for the city was $12,221.  About 11.7% of families and 18.9% of the population were below the poverty line, including 25.4% of those under age 18 and 14.0% of those age 65 or over.

Notable events

On February 4, 2006, Gassville police officer Jim Sell was fatally shot when attempting to apprehend Jacob D. Robida, a fugitive wanted in connection with a Massachusetts hate crime.

On February 5, 2008, Gassville was devastated by a tornado. The town was sealed off, due to the possibility of gas leaks causing an explosion.

External links
 Map of Gassville (US Census Bureau)
 Map of Baxter County (US Census Bureau)
 Baxter County Historical and Genealogical Society

References

Cities in Baxter County, Arkansas
Cities in Arkansas